The Monken Hadley War Memorial is located immediately to the north of Monken Hadley at the western end of Camlet Way in Monken Hadley Common. It commemorates the men of the district who died in the First and Second World Wars and is in the form of a tapered decorated column with a celtic cross at the top and the names of the dead shown on the shaft. It was unveiled by Francis Fremantle, Member of Parliament for St Albans, in December 1920. It became a Grade II listed building in April 2017.

References

External links

 http://www.monkenhadleycommon.net/tour.html

World War I memorials in England
World War II memorials in England
Monken Hadley
Grade II listed monuments and memorials
Grade II listed buildings in the London Borough of Barnet
Military memorials in London